José Giovanni Ramos (born April 12, 1983 in El Tocuyo) is a Venezuelan sprint canoer who competed in the late 2000s. At the 2008 Summer Olympics in Beijing, he was eliminated in the semifinals of both the K-2 500 m and the K-2 1000 m events.

References
 Sports-Reference.com profile

1983 births
People from Lara (state)
Canoeists at the 2008 Summer Olympics
Living people
Olympic canoeists of Venezuela
Venezuelan male canoeists
Pan American Games medalists in canoeing
Pan American Games bronze medalists for Venezuela

Central American and Caribbean Games gold medalists for Venezuela
Central American and Caribbean Games silver medalists for Venezuela
Central American and Caribbean Games bronze medalists for Venezuela
Canoeists at the 2007 Pan American Games
Competitors at the 2006 Central American and Caribbean Games
Competitors at the 2014 Central American and Caribbean Games
Central American and Caribbean Games medalists in canoeing
Medalists at the 2007 Pan American Games